The 1979 NCAA Division I-AA football rankings are from the Associated Press. This is for the 1979 season.

Legend

Associated Press poll

Notes
 Boise State (10–1) was on probation for a November 1978 scouting violation and was ineligible for the poll.

References

Rankings
NCAA Division I FCS football rankings